Milton Edward Lord (June 12, 1898 – February 12, 1985) was an American librarian and academic who was president of the American Library Association from 1949 to 1950.

Lord studied engineering at Harvard University, graduating in 1919. He chose to study Library Science after serving as a part-time assistant in the library for several years. He acted as librarian of Harvard Union in Cambridge, Massachusetts before spending a year at the Ecole des Sciences Politiques in Paris in 1925. He went on to spend four years in Italy as librarian of the American Academy in Rome, where he participated in an effort to recatalog the Vatican Library.

In 1930, Lord then became a professor and director of university libraries at the University of Iowa. He also directed the library school at the University of Iowa.  Lord left Iowa in 1932 to become Director of the Boston Public Library, where he stayed until he retired in 1965.

References

 

1898 births
1985 deaths
American librarians
Presidents of the American Library Association
Harvard University alumni
American expatriates in Italy
Librarians of the Boston Public Library